CASA (Center for Advanced Studies and the Arts) is a public consortium high school in Oak Park, Michigan offering students from surrounding schools afternoon classes in Advanced Placement (A.P.) classes; art, dance and music courses; and courses that might not have enough demand at a single high school (such as Japanese).  Students are bussed to CASA from their "home schools" for two 55-minute class periods per day.

The participating schools are Berkley, Clawson, Hazel Park, Ferndale, Lamphere, Madison, Oak Park High Schools, Pontiac High School and International Technology Academy.

References

External links
CASA website

Public high schools in Michigan
High schools in Oakland County, Michigan